This article is a list of shopping malls in Argentina, locally referred to as "shopping centers".

Buenos Aires (city)

Abasto de Buenos Aires
Alto Palermo
Buenos Aires Design
Del Parque Shopping
Devoto Shopping
Dot Baires
El Solar Shopping
Galería Güemes
Galerías Pacífico
Paseo Alcorta
Paseo La Plaza
Patio Bullrich
Plaza Liniers Shopping Center
Village Caballito
Village Recoleta

Buenos Aires (province)
Alto Avellaneda (Avellaneda)
Bahía Blanca Plaza Shopping (Bahía Blanca)
Las Palmas del Pilar (Pilar)
Los Gallegos Shopping (Mar del Plata)
Maschwitz Mall (Ingeniero Maschwitz)
Nine Shopping (Moreno)
Norcenter (Vicente López)
Nordelta Centro Comercial (Tigre)
Paseo Pilar (Pilar)
Plaza Oeste (Morón)
San Justo Shopping (San Justo)
Soleil (San Isidro)
Tortugas Open Mall (Tortuguitas)
Unicenter (Martínez)

Catamarca
Catamarca Shopping Terminal (San Fernando del Valle de Catamarca)

Chaco 
 Sarmiento Shopping Mall (Resistencia)

Chubut
Portal de Madryn (Puerto Madryn)

Córdoba

Córdoba Shopping (Córdoba)
Dinosaurio Mall (Córdoba)
Nuevocentro (Córdoba)
Paseo Rivera Indarte (Córdoba)
Patio Olmos (Córdoba)
Villa Allende Shopping (Villa Allende, Córdoba, Argentina)
Paseo del Jockey (Córdoba)Inicio

Corrientes
Centenario Shopping (Corrientes)

Jujuy
Annuar Shopping (San Salvador de Jujuy)

Mendoza

Mendoza Plaza Shopping (Guaymallén)
Palmares Open Mall (Godoy Cruz)
Barraca Mall (Guaymallén)

Misiones
Duty Free Shop Puerto Iguazú (Puerto Iguazú)
Posadas Plaza Shopping (Posadas)
Punto Iguazú (Puerto Iguazú)

Neuquén
Portal Patagonia (Neuquén)

Salta
Alto NOA Shopping (Salta)
El Palacio Galerías (Salta)

Santa Fe
Alto Rosario (Rosario)
Portal Rosario (Rosario)
Shopping del Siglo (Rosario)

Tucumán
Portal Tucumán (Yerba Buena)
Solar del Cerro (Yerba Buena)
Yerba Buena Shopping (Yerba Buena)

Footnotes

Shopping malls
Argentina